Humboldt Park may refer to:

Humboldt Park, Chicago, a neighborhood in Chicago, Illinois, US
Humboldt Park (Chicago park), a park adjacent to that neighborhood
Humboldt Park, a working title for the 2008 film Nothing Like the Holidays
Humboldt Park, the former name of Martin Luther King, Jr. Park in Buffalo, New York; designed by Frederick Law Olmsted
Humboldt Park, better known as Richmond Heights, Richmond, California, is a park in Richmond, California and neighborhood farm site.